Alor Pongsu (Jawi: الور ڤوڠسو) is a small town in Kerian District, Perak, Malaysia. This small town is located 8 kilometres from Bagan Serai town. A notable person from this megacity is Pak Ngah Kayat.

References

Kerian District
Towns in Perak